Pamela Louisa Eleanor Onslow, Countess of Onslow (née Hon. Pamela Louisa Eleanor Dillon; 26 August 1915 – 14 April 1992)  was an English socialite. She was born in Dorchester, Dorset, the daughter of Eric Dillon, 19th Viscount Dillon. She married the 6th Earl of Onslow on 4 August 1936, several weeks before her 21st birthday. The marriage was dissolved by divorce in 1962.

The couple had two children: Michael William Coplestone Dillon Onslow, 7th Earl of Onslow (28 February 1938 – 14 May 2011), and Lady Teresa Lorraine Onslow (born 26 February 1940). Teresa Onslow married Catholic writer/editor Auberon Waugh. Auberon and Teresa Waugh had four children. Dillon held the office of Justice of the Peace for Guildford in 1950.

Littlejohn Affair
Lady Onslow was involved in the Littlejohn Affair, a spy scandal involving an alleged MI6 double agent, Kenneth Littlejohn, whom she had met when visiting prison in the 1960s. She reportedly introduced Littlejohn to the British security forces who later used Littlejohn in anti-IRA operations. In 1975, she received a letter bomb which fortunately for her failed to detonate properly, causing only minor injuries. She reportedly declined hospital treatment for the injuries.

Death
Lady Onslow died in Kensington, London in 1992, aged 76.

References

1915 births
1992 deaths
British countesses
Daughters of viscounts
English justices of the peace
Pamela